Hannah Felicity May Reid (born 30 December 1989) is the English lead singer, keyboardist and songwriter of the indie pop band London Grammar.

Biography
Reid grew up in Acton, and went to school in West London. She received vocal training, and wanted to pursue psychoanalysis as a career, working as a hairdresser and in a bar, before going to university. She was initially planning to pursue acting after earning a drama scholarship. Reid was studying art history and English at the University of Nottingham where she met guitarist Dan Rothman in a residence hall. Together with Rothman and Dominic 'Dot' Major, she started the band London Grammar in 2009.

Hannah's battle with stage fright has been widely reported; in an interview she said about being on stage “(...)sometimes the nerves don't lift at all, and I just feel horrible, and panicky throughout.” To help combat this phobia, she started practising Emotional Freedom Technique (EFT). She was caught in the middle of a Twitter polemic after the Radio 1 Breakfast Show sent out a sexist tweet about her appearance. Reid is also known for her expansive vocal range and emotive contralto voice.

References

1989 births
Living people
English women singer-songwriters
English contraltos